Arches station (French: Gare d'Arches) is a railway station serving the commune of Arches, Vosges department, France.  The station is owned and operated by SNCF, in the TER Grand Est regional rail network and is served by TER trains.

See also 

 List of SNCF stations in Grand Est

References 

Railway stations in Vosges (department)